Live in Brisbane 2006 (2006) is a two disc live music album from Canadian singer/songwriter Jeff Martin. The album is a complete recording of a live performance full of Jeff's banter with bandmates and the audience, including his thoughts on the disbanding of The Tea Party and where he sees himself in life.

Track listing

Disc one 
"Silence" (The Tea Party cover)
"Psychopomp" (The Tea Party)
"Requiem"(The Tea Party)
"Daystar"
"Shadows on the Mountainside" (The Tea Party)
"The Badger" (The Tea Party)
"Hallelujah" (Leonard Cohen cover)
"The Messenger" (Daniel Lanois cover)
"Inanna" (The Tea Party)

Disc two 
"White Water Siren" (The Tea Party)
"Lament"
"Black Snake Blues"
"The Bazaar" (The Tea Party)
"Oceans" (The Tea Party)
"The Kingdom"
"Sister Awake" (The Tea Party)

Personnel

Recording personnel 
Produced by Jeff Martin 
Mixed in Dublin, Ireland by Jeff Martin
Mastered at Q Music in Toronto by Jeff Martin 
Recorded live at The Tivoli, Brisbane, Australia, 10 September 2006
Published by JMartin Music (SOCAN)

Stage personnel 
Geoff McGowan (Tour Manager)
Billy Hibben (String instruments Technician)
Bruce Johnston (Sound Engineer)
Scott Barry (Monitor Engineer)
Clem Ryan (Stage and percussion technician)

Musicians 
Jeff Martin
The Toronto Table Ensemble: 
Ritesh Das 
Ian De Souza 
Joanna De Souza 
Anita Katakkar 
Heather Thorkelson

Art details 
Design by Marco Holtappel

Notes 
The  album can only be purchased at Martin's live shows or from his website.

External links 
 

Jeff Martin (Canadian musician) albums
2006 live albums